Marni Group S.r.l., commonly known as Marni, is an Italian luxury fashion house founded in 1994 by Consuelo Castiglioni in Milan, Italy. Marni was acquired by Italian fashion group OTB in 2015 and Francesco Risso was appointed Creative Director of the brand in 2016.

History
Marni was founded in Milan, Italy in 1994 by Swiss designer Consuelo Castiglioni, originally as an offshoot of the family’s fur business. 

From 2000, the company began to open stores in high-end department stores. During this period, Marni also began a virtual store. 

In 2012, Marni launched a collection for H&M, with clothes and accessories for both men and women.

The Castiglioni family sold 60 percent of the company to Renzo Rosso's OTB Group in 2012 before the company was fully acquired by the OTB Group in 2015. In 2016, Marni appointed Francesco Risso as Creative Director.

In 2018, the company appointed Stefano Biondo as its CEO. He was succeeded by Barbara Calò in 2019.

See also 
 Italian fashion

Notes and references

External links
 Marni Official website  

Clothing brands of Italy
High fashion brands
Companies based in Milan
Clothing companies established in 1994
Eyewear brands of Italy
Italian  companies established in 1994
OTB Group